Helsingborg is a city and the seat of Helsingborg Municipality, Scania (Skåne), Sweden. It is the second-largest city in Scania (after Malmö) and ninth-largest in Sweden, with a population of 113,816 (2020). The HH Ferry route across the sound has more than 70 car ferry departures from each harbour every day.

Historic Helsingborg, with its many old buildings, is a scenic coastal city. The buildings are a blend of old-style stone-built churches and a 600-year-old medieval fortress (Kärnan) in the city centre, and more modern commercial buildings. The streets vary from wide avenues to small alley-ways. Kullagatan, the main pedestrian shopping street in the city, was the first pedestrian shopping street in Sweden.

History
Helsingborg is one of the oldest cities of what is now Sweden. It has been the site of permanent settlement officially since 21 May 1085. Helsingborg's geographical position at the narrowest part of Øresund made it very important for Denmark, at that time controlling both sides of that strait. From 1429 Eric of Pomerania introduced the Sound Dues, a levy on all trading vessels passing through the sound between Helsingør and Helsingborg. This was one of the main sources of income for the Danish Crown. Crossing traffic, like fishermen, were not subject to the tax, which was initially directed against the Hanseatic League.

Following the Dano-Swedish War (1657–1658) and the Treaty of Roskilde Denmark had to give up all territory on the southern Scandinavian peninsula, and Helsingborg became part of Sweden. King Charles X Gustav of Sweden landed here on 5 March 1658 to take personal possession of the Scanian lands and was met by a delegation led by the bishop of the Diocese of Lund, Peder Winstrup. At that time the town had a population of barely 1,000 people.

Its situation on a conflict-ridden border caused problems for Helsingborg. Denmark recaptured Scania twice, but could not hold it. The last Danish attempt to regain Scania was in 1710, when 14,000 men landed on the shores near Helsingborg. The Battle of Helsingborg was fought on 10 March just outside the city, which was badly affected. It took a long time to recover; even in 1770 the city had only 1,321 inhabitants and was still growing slowly.

On 20 October 1811 Jean-Baptiste Bernadotte, Marshal of France and crown prince-elect of Sweden (later king Charles XIV John) took his first step on Swedish soil in Helsingborg on his journey from Paris to Stockholm.

From the middle of the 19th century onwards, Helsingborg was one of the fastest-growing cities of Sweden, increasing its population from 4,000 in 1850 to 20,000 in 1890 and 56,000 in 1930 due to industrialization. From 1892 a train ferry was put in service, connecting Helsingborg with its Danish sister city Helsingør. A tramway network was inaugurated in 1903 and closed down in 1967.

Following the Swedish orthography reform of 1906, the spelling of many place names in Sweden was modernized. In 1912, it was decided to use the form Hälsingborg. In preparation for the local government reform in 1971, Hälsingborg city council proposed that the new, enlarged municipality should be spelled Helsingborg; this form was adopted by the government of Sweden from 1 January 1971.

In World War II, Helsingborg was among the most important drop-off points for the rescue of Denmark's Jewish population during the Holocaust. Adolf Hitler had ordered that all Danish Jews were to be arrested and deported to the concentration camps on Rosh HaShanah, the Jewish New Year which fell on 2 October 1943. When Georg Ferdinand Duckwitz, a German maritime attaché received word of the order on 28 September 1943, he shared it with political and Jewish community leaders. Using the name Elsinore Sewing Club (Danish: Helsingør Syklub) as a cover for messages, the Danish population formed an underground railroad of sorts, moving Jews away from the closely watched Copenhagen docks to spots farther away, especially Helsingør, just two miles across the Øresund from Helsingborg. Hundreds of civilians hid their fellow Danish citizens—Jews—in their houses, farm lofts and churches until they could board them onto Danish fishing boats, personal pleasure boats and ferry boats. In the span of three nights, Danes had smuggled over 7200 Jews and 680 non-Jews (gentile family members of Jews or political activists) across the Øresund, to safety in Sweden, with one of the main destinations at Helsingborg.

Climate
Helsingborg has an oceanic climate (Cfb) typical of southern Sweden, although its winters are very mild for a location at such a high latitude. Although the temperature differences between seasons are significant, Helsingborg often lacks a meteorological winter with both January and February averaging just above the freezing point in terms of mean temperatures. Summers are warm and comparatively long by Swedish standards, with summer arriving earlier and fall later than virtually all areas of Sweden, aside from other parts of Skåne.

Demographics
113,816 live in the city of Helsingborg as of 2020, up from 104,250 inhabitants in 2015. 149,280 live in the municipality, with the city being by far the most populated one. Helsingborg is the second-largest city in Scania (after Malmö) and ninth-largest in Sweden.

Subdivisions
The City of Helsingborg is subdivided into 31 districts.

Economy

Industry

Helsingborg is a major regional centre of trade, transport and business. In 2001 Campus Helsingborg, a branch of University of Lund, opened in the former Tretorn rubber factory buildings, founded by Henry Dunker.
Three ferry companies take people and cargo to and from Denmark around the clock. The route is popular with day-trippers going to Helsingør or Copenhagen, or simply enjoying the views from the ferries.
IKEA, the retailer of furniture and home interiors, has its international corporate headquarters in Helsingborg.
Nicorette, the nicotine chewing gum, has a manufacturing plant there. Ramlösa is a mineral water from Ramlösa Brunn, a southern suburb of the city. Mobile phone developer Spectronic is also situated in Helsingborg. The online custom clothing retailer Tailor Store Sweden AB has its offices in Helsingborg. Zoégas, a major coffee company, has been located here since the 1800s.

Sports

The following sports clubs are located in Helsingborg:

Notable people

Sights

See also
European route E4
Helsingborgs Dagblad
Sofiero, a nearby castle

References

External links

Helsingborg Municipality

 
Municipal seats of Skåne County
Swedish municipal seats
Populated places in Helsingborg Municipality
Populated places in Skåne County
Port cities in Sweden
Port cities and towns of the Øresund
Denmark–Sweden border crossings
Coastal cities and towns in Sweden
1085 establishments in Europe
11th-century establishments in Skåne County
Cities in Skåne County